Wang Peng (born 12 May 1991) is a Chinese footballer currently playing as a defender for Tai'an Tiankuang in China League Two.

Career statistics

Club
.

References

1991 births
Living people
Footballers from Dalian
Footballers from Liaoning
Chinese footballers
Association football defenders
China League Two players
China League One players
Chengdu Tiancheng F.C. players
Heilongjiang Ice City F.C. players
Beijing Sport University F.C. players